Corky Romano  is a 2001 American mafia comedy film starring Chris Kattan, Fred Ward, Vinessa Shaw, Chris Penn, and Peter Berg. The movie was produced by Robert Simond, directed by Rob Pritts, and was written by David Garrett and Jason Ward. In the movie, Kattan plays the title character, a veterinarian who is forced by his mobster family to infiltrate the local FBI facility to steal evidence incriminating his father, Mafia boss Francis A. "Pops" Romano (Peter Falk), of racketeering charges. It opened in theaters on October 12, 2001.

Plot
Veterinary technician Corky Romano (Chris Kattan), banished from his family after the death of his mother, is unaware of their criminal connections until he receives a call from his father "Pops" (Peter Falk), a Mafia crime lord. Indicted on racketeering charges and knowing the strong case against him, Pops has concluded the only solution is to destroy the FBI’s evidence.

At the family mansion, a bedridden Pops convinces Corky to infiltrate the local FBI office, since the Romano family cannot send anyone with known underworld connections, such as Corky's brothers Paulie (Peter Berg) and Peter (Chris Penn). With the aid of a computer hacker, Corky obtains a false identity, “Agent Corky Pissant” and gains access to the building, where he discovers from office chief Howard Schuster (Richard Roundtree) that, according to his falsified résumé, "Pissant" graduated from Harvard, speaks five different languages, is an expert sharpshooter, and has extensive martial arts training.

Corky makes several trips to the evidence room, only to be sidetracked each time. He is sent on investigations and raids, with several assignments tied to the Night Vulture, a heroin trafficker who is number six on the FBI's Most Wanted List. Corky's frequent mistakes often inadvertently solve the problem at hand, leading others at the FBI to assume Corky has developed intricate strategies. He receives praise at the office and in the local media, though Agent Brick Davis (Matthew Glave) remains jealous and suspicious.

Corky develops feelings for FBI agent Kate Russo (Vinessa Shaw), but she seems uninterested until they bump into each other at the Romano mansion, where Russo has been sent undercover to collect more evidence against the family. Corky convinces Russo that he is also working undercover, and befriends agents Bob Cox (Roger Fan) and Terrence Darnell (Dave Sheridan). Cox and Darnell are captured trying to infiltrate one of Pops' underground casinos. Corky comes to the rescue, but is caught by the bouncers; revealed to be a member of the Romano family, he asks them to let his friends go.

Corky obtains the evidence file regarding Pops, and discovers that his father will be facing murder charges. Shocked, he tells Pops, who vehemently denies killing anyone. Snooping through family photo albums, Russo discovers that Corky is a Romano and not an FBI agent. The entire FBI office raids the Romano mansion, where it is revealed that family friend Leo Corrigan (Fred Ward) is an FBI informant and has been lying about the extent of the family's crimes, including the alleged murder; it is also discovered that Brick Davis is the Night Vulture. Corky knocks Leo unconscious with a light fixture, and Davis is arrested by his fellow agents.

Corky and Russo marry and drive off in Corky's bright yellow Mazda Miata. Corky gains the respect and love of his entire family, and his former boss at the veterinary clinic retires, giving Corky the keys to the business.

Cast
Chris Kattan as Corky Romano/Agent Pissant
Vinessa Shaw as Agent Kate Russo
Peter Falk as Francis A. "Pops" Romano
Peter Berg as Paulie Romano
Chris Penn as Peter Romano
Fred Ward as Leo Corrigan
Matthew Glave as Agent Brick Davis
Richard Roundtree as Howard Shuster
Roger Fan as Agent Bob Cox
Dave Sheridan as Agent Terrence Darnell
Michael Massee as Angry Gunman
Vincent Pastore as Tony
Zach Galifianakis as Computer Hacker Dexter
Rena Mero as Female Bouncer

Production
In his 2019 autobiography Baby Don't Hurt Me, Chris Kattan claimed that Paul Thomas Anderson (writer-director of Boogie Nights and Magnolia) and Richard LaGravenese (screenwriter of The Fisher King) each assisted with rewriting the script for Corky Romano, for which they received no official credit.

The nickname "Corky" is alleged to be taken from real life New Jersey mobster Gaetano Vastola whose nickname among the mafia ranks as a street soldier was "Corky". Gaetano is also believed to have been the model for the fictional character in The Sopranos, Hesh Rabkin (played by Jerry Adler).

Critical reception
Corky Romano was panned by critics. On Rotten Tomatoes, it holds a 7% rating based on 83 reviews with the consensus stating: "Corky Romano continues the trend of bad movies featuring SNL members. The jokes are tired and unfunny, and the slapstick feels forced."

James Berardinelli rated the film half a star out of four, stating: "It only takes about three minutes of running time to realize that you have wasted your money. The question is whether you have the stamina to endure all 80 minutes. 'I survived Corky' tee-shirts should be given out to everyone who stays until the end credits roll and can provide proof that they didn't take the easy way out of napping." Roger Ebert also rated the film half a star out of four stars, calling it "a desperately unfunny gangster spoof" and wrote: "The concept is exhausted, the ideas are tired, the physical gags are routine, the story is labored, the actors look like they can barely contain their doubts about the project." Miles Beller was one of the few critics who gave a positive review, saying: "Although Corky Romano contains its share of witless wisecracks and puerile pranks, it achieves something more than the current crop of would-be funny films. With a great many contemporary comedies mistaking excess for invention and hyperactivity for dynamism, Corky Romano displays genuine heart."

Actor Robert Pattinson has listed the film as one of his personal favorites.

Box office

Overall, the movie was a commercial success for producer Robert Simonds, earning back its $11 million budget against $24,400,000 domestically. Corky Romano was released on VHS and DVD on May 14, 2002.

References

External links

2001 films
2001 comedy films
Films about the American Mafia
Mafia comedy films
Touchstone Pictures films
Films scored by Randy Edelman
2001 directorial debut films
American comedy films
2000s English-language films
2000s American films